Giulio Mattei (1561–1624) was a Roman Catholic prelate who served as Bishop of Bitetto (1611–1624).

Biography
Giulio Mattei was born in Monte San Savini, Italy in 1561. On 18 May 1611, he was appointed during the papacy of Pope Paul V as Bishop of Bitetto. On 23 May 1611, he was consecrated bishop by Roberto Francesco Romolo Bellarmino, Cardinal-Priest of San Matteo in Merulana, with Attilio Amalteo, Titular Archbishop of Athenae, and Antonio d'Aquino, Bishop of Sarno, serving as co-consecrators. He served as Bishop of Bitetto until his death in 1624.

References

17th-century Italian Roman Catholic bishops
Bishops appointed by Pope Paul V
1561 births
1624 deaths